Elysium is a section of the Underworld in Greek mythology.

Elysium may also refer to:

Music
 Elysium (band), a Polish death metal band

Albums
 Elysium (Pet Shop Boys album), 2012
 Elysium (Stratovarius album), 2011
 Elysium (The Velvet Teen album), 2004

Lieder and songs
 "Elysium" (Schubert), a lied by Franz Schubert on a poem by Friedrich Schiller
 "Elysium", a song by Scott Brown
 "Elysium (I Go Crazy)", a remix version by Ultrabeat
 "Elysium", a song by 36 Crazyfists from Rest Inside the Flames
 "Elysium", a song by Chelsea Grin from Desolation of Eden
 "Elysium", a song by Madness from Wonderful
 "Elysium", a song by Mary Chapin Carpenter from Between Here and Gone
 "Elysium", a song by Portishead from Portishead

Places
 Elysium (building), a proposed skyscraper in Melbourne, Australia
 Elysium Arena, an indoor arena in Cleveland, Ohio, US

Mars
 Elysium Mons, a volcano on Mars
 Elysium Planitia, a plain on Mars
 Elysium quadrangle, a region on Mars covered by a United States Geological Survey map
 Elysium (volcanic province), an albedo feature and volcanic region on Mars

Fictional
 Elysium (Dungeons & Dragons), a plane of existence in Dungeons & Dragons
 Elysium, a commune in the 2012 film Wanderlust
 Elysium, the utopic city in the Deponia games series
 Elysium, a planet beyond the Solar System in Battlezone
 Elysium, a place of paradise for humanity in Xenoblade Chronicles 2
 Elysium, the moon and the location of the final dungeon in Mega Man Legends 2
 Elysium Labs, a medical laboratory that resides in the city of Glass in Mirror's Edge Catalyst
 Elysium, the fictional world that Disco Elysium takes place in.

Other uses
 Elysium (film), a 2013 film directed by Neill Blomkamp
 Elysium Industries, developers of the Molten Chloride Salt Fast Reactor or MCSFR

See also
Elizium, an album by Fields of the Nephilim, 1990